Naomi Kara (born 18 June 1986) is a New Zealand rugby league footballer who plays as a  for the New Zealand Warriors in the NRL Women's Premiership.

Background
Born in Cambridge, New Zealand, Kara played her junior rugby league for the Cambridge Raiders and the Runaway Bay Seagulls. Her younger brother Kurt is a former New Zealand Māori representative.

Playing career
In 2017, Kara played Greenacre Tigers in the NSWRL Women's Premiership. In 2019 and 2020, she played for the Wests Tigers.

In September 2020, she joined the New Zealand Warriors NRL Women's Premiership team. In Round 3 of the 2020 NRLW season, Kara made her debut for the Warriors, starting at halfback in a 22–10 win over the St George Illawarra Dragons.

References

External links
New Zealand Warriors profile

1986 births
Living people
New Zealand Māori rugby league players
New Zealand female rugby league players
Rugby league halfbacks
New Zealand Warriors (NRLW) players